This is a list of films produced and co-produced in Quebec, Canada ordered by year of release. Although the majority of Quebec films are produced in French due to Quebec's predominantly francophone population, a number of English language films are also produced in the province.

1930s

1940s

1950s

1960s

1970s

1980s

1990s

2000s

2010s

2020s

See also
 Cinema of Quebec
 Prix Iris
 List of Quebec film directors
 Culture of Quebec
 List of French-language Canadian television series
 List of Canadian films

References

External links
 List of the most popular Quebec films (theatrically) since 1985
 List of the most popular Quebec films in France (theatrically) since 2000

Films, List of Quebec
Quebec